Sport+ may refer to:
 Sport+ (France), a cable and satellite television channel owned by Canal+
 Sport+ (Greece), a digital terrestrial television station owned by ERT
 Sport+, a sister channel of TV+, Bulgaria